The 1965 Tulane Green Wave football team was an American football team that represented Tulane University during the 1965 NCAA University Division football season as a member of the Southeastern Conference. In their fourth year under head coach Tommy O'Boyle, the team compiled a 2–8 record. This marked the final season Tulane competed as a member of the Southeastern Conference as University President Herbert E. Longenecker announced their formal withdrawal from SEC competition, effective June 1966.

The Green Wave competed as an independent for the next 30 seasons before joining Conference USA in 1996.

Schedule

Notes

References

Tulane
Tulane Green Wave football seasons
Tulane Green Wave football